Yorgos Lamprinos is a Greek-French film editor. He was nominated for an Academy Award in the category Best Film Editing for the film The Father.

Selected filmography 
 The Father (2020)
 The Son (2022)

References

External links 

Living people
Place of birth missing (living people)
Year of birth missing (living people)
French people of Greek descent
French film editors
Greek film editors